Yoon Shi-yoon (born Yoon Dong-gu on September 26, 1986), also known professionally as Yun Si Yun, is a South Korean actor and television personality. He is best known for his leading roles in King of Baking, Kim Takgu (2010), My Cute Guys (2013), Hit the Top (2017), Grand Prince (2018) and Your Honor (2018), Nokdu Flower (2019), Psychopath Diary (2019-2020), and Train (2020). From 2016 to 2019, he was a member of the third season of variety show 2 Days & 1 Night.

Early life
Yoon was born in a small town in Suncheon as Yoon Dong-gu, a name he used until an official change of name upon his entry into college. He is the only child of his family, and was raised by his grandparents. At the time, while peers of his age went to kindergarten and learned English, Yoon went to seodang, a traditional school that taught Confucianism, and learned to read Hanja (Chinese characters). Yoon's unique childhood was then unveiled through his song "Grandpa's Bicycle" for Barefooted Friends.

Career

2009–2010: Rising popularity and breakthrough
Yoon debuted in the daily sitcom High Kick Through the Roof and rose to fame for his role as a semi-rebellious teenager. He was nominated for Best New Actor in TV at the Baeksang Arts Awards, and won MBC's Best Couple award with his co-star Shin Se-kyung.

The following year, Yoon was cast as the main character in the slice-of-life television series King of Baking, Kim Takgu. The drama's writer, Kang Eun-kyung, saw Yoon in High Kick Through the Roof and picked him for the role. The series was one of the most watched shows in South Korea in 2010 with a final episode viewership rating of 50.8%; and Yoon became a household name in Korea. Due to the drama's popularity, Yoon and co-star Lee Young-ah were named promotional ambassadors for North Chungcheong Province.

The same year, Yoon had his first big screen debut with a leading role in the horror movie Death Bell 2: Bloody Camp.

Yoon appeared in a commercial for the cellphone Bubi Bubi with the famous girl group T-ara. He also sung 4 singles for the soundtrack of the commercial.

2011–2014: Leading roles
In 2011, Yoon was cast to replace Kim Jaewon, who withdrew after suffering from multiple injuries on the first day of filming, in the romantic-comedy Me Too, Flower!. He played a millionaire masquerading as a parking attendant and entering into relationship with an abrasive female police officer (Lee Ji-ah). However, the drama scored low viewership ratings and had to be pre-empted.

In 2012, Yoon starred in the Japanese web drama Brand Guardians, based on a story about a Korean youth who travels to Japan to make it as a fashion stylist. The project was orchestrated by the JAFIC (Japan Apparel-Fashion Industry Council) to increase awareness of Japanese fashion. He then filmed his first Chinese drama Happy Noodles. On December 8, Yoon won the Popular Star Prize in China at the 2012 Asia Top 10 Popular Star Awards by CETV.

In 2013, he starred in the cable series My Cute Guys, the third installment of tvN 's "flower boy" series. Yoon plays a genius game developer, who accidentally enters the life of a modern Rapunzel (played by Park Shin-hye). The series was the highest sold cable drama ever to Japan. Yoon then became a cast member of Barefooted Friends, which was his first variety show. In October, Yoon was cast in KBS's romantic comedy series Prime Minister & I alongside Lee Beom-soo and Girls' Generation's Yoona.  He lent his voice for the animated movie Doraemon: Nobita's Secret Gadget Museum.

In 2014, Yoon starred opposite Yeo Jin-goo in the film Mr. Perfect, where he plays a professional golfer who loses everything but later becomes a golf coach.

2016–present: Comeback from military service 
After completing military service, Yoon starred in JTBC's historical fantasy drama Mirror of the Witch, playing Joseon's famous doctor Heo Jun. The drama is a fictional story about a young Heo Jun and his journey to lift a curse for a princess (played by Kim Sae-ron), whom he later fell in love with. In May 2016, he became a regular cast member of the third season of popular variety show 2 Days & 1 Night.

In October 2016, Yoon was cast in a three-episode miniseries, Romance Full of Life, which is part of MBC's 9-episode miniseries, Three Color Fantasy. The drama premiered in March 2017. The same year, Yoon starred in KBS2's youth drama Hit the Top.

In 2018, Yoon starred in the historical romance melodrama Grand Prince. The series was a ratings success becoming the highest rated TV Chosun drama since the network's establishment in 2011. He next starred in the legal drama Your Honor, playing double roles as a judge and convict. Yoon play as a twin named Han Kang-ho and Han Soo-ho. Han Soo-ho is a top judge who is very attached to personal belongings, meanwhile Han Kang-ho is a five-time convicted criminal who takes over his twin's job after his brother mysteriously disappears. In the same year Yoon was cast in the film Private Woman alongside Kim Yoon-hye. Yoon will play the role of a man who has a big scar on his heart and sentimental memories from his relationship with his first love.

In 2019, Yoon starred in historical drama Nokdu Flower. In the same year, Yoon starred in tvN's comedy thriller drama, Psychopath Diary. Yoon plays a naive and pushover stockbroker, who begins to believe he is a psychopathic murderer after an accident which results in amnesia and the discovery of a diary in his possession.  He did voice acting for the animated movie Paboos (2019) as Doctor Flag and also in another animated movie Bakugan:Battle Force (2019) as Enemy 1.

In 2020, Yoon starred in OCN (TV channel)'s action-romance drama, Train (TV series). Yoon plays a dual role as Seo Do-Won, a police officer on the path of atonement in universe "A" and a senior police inspector who has chosen the path of corruption in universe "B".

Personal life
Yoon is an avid lover of books. It is stated that he possesses over 2000 books at home.

On April 28, 2014, Yoon secretly enlisted into the Republic of Korea Marine Corps. Yoon had previously expressed his desire to enlist secretly, in order to avoid harming other soldiers. On January 27, 2016, Yoon completed his military service.

Filmography

Film

Television series

Web series

Television show

Host

Music video

Discography

Soundtrack

Awards and nominations

Listicles

References

External links
 MOA Entertainment Naver Page 
 MOA Entertainment Instagram

 

1986 births
Living people
South Korean male film actors
South Korean male television actors
South Korean Protestants
South Korean television presenters
South Korean broadcasters
VJs (media personalities)
21st-century South Korean male actors
Republic of Korea Marine Corps personnel